Location estimation in wireless sensor networks is the problem of estimating the location of an object from a set of noisy measurements. These measurements are acquired in a distributed
manner by a set of sensors.

Use

Many civilian and military applications require monitoring that can identify objects in a specific area, such as monitoring the front entrance of a private house by a single camera. Monitored areas that are large relative to objects of interest often require multiple sensors (e.g., infra-red detectors) at multiple locations. A centralized observer or computer application monitors the sensors. The communication to power and bandwidth requirements call for efficient design of the sensor, transmission, and processing.

The CodeBlue system of Harvard University is an example where a vast number of sensors distributed among hospital facilities allow staff to locate a patient in distress. In addition, the sensor array enables online recording of medical information while allowing the patient to move around. Military applications (e.g. locating an intruder into a secured area) are also good candidates for setting a wireless sensor network.

Setting

Let  denote the position of interest. A set of  sensors
acquire measurements  contaminated by an
additive noise  owing some known or unknown probability density function (PDF). The sensors transmit measurements to a central processor. The th sensor encodes
 by a function . The application processing the data applies a pre-defined estimation rule
. The set of message functions
 and the fusion rule  are
designed to minimize estimation error.
For example: minimizing the mean squared error (MSE),
.

Ideally, sensors transmit their measurements 
In this
settings, the maximum likelihood estimator (MLE)  is an unbiased estimator whose MSE is
 assuming a white Gaussian noise
. The next sections suggest
alternative designs when the sensors are bandwidth constrained to
1 bit transmission, that is =0 or 1.

Known noise PDF

A Gaussian noise
 system can be designed as follows:

 

 

Here  is a parameter leveraging our prior knowledge of the
In this design, the random value
The
processing center averages the received bits to form an estimate
It can be verified that for the optimal (and
infeasible) choice of  the variance of this estimator
variance of MLE without bandwidth constraint. The variance
A coarse estimation can be used to overcome this limitation. However, it requires additional hardware in each of
the sensors.

A system design with arbitrary (but known) noise PDF can be found in. In this setting it is assumed that both  and
the noise  are confined to some known interval . The
estimator of  also reaches an MSE which is a constant factor
times . In this method, the prior knowledge of  replaces
the parameter  of the previous approach.

Unknown noise parameters

A noise model may be sometimes available while the exact PDF parameters are unknown (e.g. a Gaussian PDF with unknown ).
thresholds , such that  sensors are designed
. The processing center estimation rule is generated as follows:

 

 

As before, prior knowledge is necessary to set values for
 to have an MSE with a reasonable factor
of the unconstrained MLE variance.

Unknown noise PDF

PDF is unknown. The following model is considered for this scenario:

 

 

 

In addition, the message functions are limited to have the form

 

The fusion estimator is also restricted to be linear, i.e.
.

The design should set the decision intervals  and the
coefficients .
 and so on. It can be shown that these decision
intervals and the corresponding set of coefficients 
produce a universal -unbiased estimator, which is an
estimator satisfying 
In fact, this intuitive
design of the decision intervals is also optimal in the following
sense. The above design requires
 to satisfy the universal
-unbiased property while theoretical arguments show that
an optimal (and a more complex) design of the decision intervals
would require , that is:
the number of sensors is nearly optimal. It is also argued in 
that if the targeted MSE
 uses a small
enough , then this design requires a factor of 4 in the
number of sensors to achieve the same variance of the MLE in
the unconstrained bandwidth settings.

Additional information

The design of the sensor array requires optimizing the power
allocation as well as minimizing the communication traffic of the
entire system. The design suggested in  incorporates probabilistic quantization in
sensors and a simple optimization program that is solved in the
fusion center only once. The fusion center then broadcasts a set
of parameters to the sensors that allows them to finalize their
design of messaging functions  as to meet the energy
constraints. Another work employs a similar approach to address
distributed detection in wireless sensor arrays.

External links 
 CodeBlue Harvard group working on wireless sensor network technology to a range of medical applications.

References 

Estimation theory
Detection theory
Wireless sensor network